Queen of Hearts is a British comedy film directed by Jon Amiel in 1989.

Plot 
"An epic tale of romance, revenge... and cappuccino". An Italian couple marry for love and elope to London. Four children later, they are running a café in the Italian Quarter. The story is told through the eyes of young Eddie Luca.

Cast 
 Vittorio Duse as Nonno
 Joseph Long as Danilo
 Anita Zagaria as Rosa
 Eileen Way as Mama Sibilla
 Vittorio Amandola as Barbariccia
 Ian Hawkes as Eddie
 Cliff Parisi in one of his first screen roles, as "manager"

Production
A UK and US co-production, filming took place in Italy and the UK, with a mixed Italian and British cast. It was the first cinema film directed by Jon Amiel, and the first feature film written by Tony Grisoni.

Reception
The film received mostly positive reviews. On Rotten Tomatoes 3 of 4 critic reviews were positive. US film critic Leonard Maltin included Queen of Hearts in his list of "Great Films You Can't Find on DVD" as well as his book "Leonard Maltin’s 151 Best Movies You’ve Never Seen", and called it an "extraordinary and unusual film about an Italian couple who lead a pleasantly quixotic life in England running a family cafe. Tony Grisoni's screenplay embraces elements of romance, humor, melodrama, mysticism and fantasy in a heady mix. Remarkable first feature for director Amiel." Roger Ebert said that it "has the same sort of magical romanticism as "Moonstruck," but in a more gentle key" and rated it 3.5 out of 4.
It won the Montréal First Film Prize at the Montreal World Film Festival in 1989 (at which Vittorio Duse won the best supporting actor prize for his portrayal of Nonno in the film), and won the Grand Prix at the 1990 Festival du Film de Paris.

References

External links
 
 Time Out magazine's review of the film

1989 films
1989 comedy films
1989 directorial debut films
American comedy films
British comedy films
Films directed by Jon Amiel
Films scored by Michael Convertino
Films shot in Italy
1980s English-language films
1980s American films
1980s British films
English-language comedy films